Vincent Godfrey Burns (1893 in Brooklyn – 1979) was Poet Laureate of Maryland, from 1962 until 1979.

Life
He graduated from Penn State University in 1916, Harvard University, and Union Theological Seminary in 1922. He studied at Columbia University from 1922 to 1924.
He served in World War I, in the 163rd Field Artillery.
He was ordained as a Congregational minister.
He married Edna Rodenberger in 1924; they had one daughter.

He collaborated with his brother, Robert, on I Am a Fugitive from a Georgia Chain Gang.
It was made into a movie in 1932, by Warner Brothers, and was nominated for several Academy Awards. He was appointed Poet Laureate of Maryland in 1962, by Governor J. Millard Tawes. There were attempts to unseat him, he remained Poet Laureate until his death in 1979.

His papers are held at the University of Maryland, Maryland Historical Society,
Columbia University, Syracuse University,
and Kent State University.

Works
 The Master's Message for the New Day, Association Press, 1926
 The Red Harvest, a Cry for Peace, Macmillan, 1930; Granger Books, 1976
 I'm in Love with Life Dutton, 1932
 Female Convict Macauley, 1932; Pyramid, 1959
 America I Love You New World Books, 1957
 Flame Against the Night New World Books, 1959
 An American Poet Speaks New World Books, 1960
 Memories and Melodies of Maryland New World Books, 1964
 Maryland's Revolutionary Hero New World Books, 1965
 The Four Tests of a Loyal American Patriotic Women's Clubs of America, 1966
 Ballads of the Free State Bard New World Books, 1967
 Songs of the Free State Bards New World Books, 1967
 Heart on Fire New World Books, 1969
 World on Fire New World Books, 1969
 Red Fuse on a World Bomb New World Books, 1969
 The Sunny Side of Life New World Books, 1970
 Poetry is Fun New World Books, 1971
 The Story of Old Glory New World Books, 1972
Redwood: And Other Poems, reprint Kessinger Publishing, LLC, 2010, 
Vincent Godfrey Burns, Robert Elliott Burns, Out of these chains, New World Books, 1942

References

External links
Finding aid to the Vincent Godfrey Burns papers at Columbia University Rare Book & Manuscript Library
Vincent Godfrey Burns papers Collection overview at the University of Maryland libraries

1893 births
1979 deaths
20th-century American poets
Harvard University alumni
Pennsylvania State University alumni
Poets Laureate of Maryland
Union Theological Seminary (New York City) alumni